Heo Kyung-hwan (born February 16, 1981), is a South Korean comedian. He debuted as a comedian on Gag Concert, and is best known for his acts 'Four Men', 'Seoul Mate', and 'Dignity of a Beggar'. He is also known for the shows The Human Condition and Mamma Mia. It was revealed that he signed a contract with Cube Entertainment on 4 February 2016. In February 2022, Heo signed with Think Entertainment.

Filmography

Television series

Television   shows

Web shows

Awards and nominations

State honors

References
https://www.latest.facebook.com/tyanged/

External links
 
 

1981 births
Living people
South Korean male comedians
South Korean television personalities
Gag Concert
Gimhae Heo clan